Gus Hardin (born Carolyn Ann Blankenship; April 9, 1945 – February 17, 1996) was a country music singer.

Career
Hardin was born in 1945 in Tulsa, Oklahoma. Her rise to country music popularity began in 1983 with her first single for RCA Records single, the top 10 hit "After The Last Goodbye." Other hits, such as "Fallen Angel," "I Pass," "Lovin' You Hurts" and "If I Didn't Love You" soon followed,  as well as "All Tangled Up in Love," a duet with Earl Thomas Conley. She recorded and released "One of the Boys" and "Mama Knows" by songwriter Kevin Weyl, and "Tornado" by Kevin Weyl and Steve Robertson which is featured in the sound track of the Kevin Pollak film Deterrence.

Hardin married keyboard player Steve Hardin, who was a member of the group Point Blank, and after their divorce kept his last name. Garth Brooks' sister, Betsy Smittle, was one of Gus's band members and did background vocals on Gus's album I'm Dancing as Fast as I Can.

Death
On February 17, 1996, Hardin died in a car accident on State Highway 20 west of Salina, Oklahoma near her home in the Lake Hudson area. A laboratory report listed her blood alcohol level at 0.28 percent.  Memorial services were held in Oklahoma and Nashville, Tennessee. Gus Hardin is survived by daughter Toni Jones and granddaughter Chelsea Johnson, both of Sapulpa, Oklahoma.

Discography

Albums

Singles

Music videos

Awards

Top New Female Vocalist 
-1984 Academy of Country Music

New Country Artist
-1983 Billboard
-1983 Cashbox

The Oklahoma Award
-1983 Oklahoma Awards Assoc.

Nominations

BEST PERFORMANCE BY A DUET
"All Tangled Up In Love" with Earl Thomas Conley
1985 Country Music Assoc.
1985 Academy of Country Music
1985 Music City News

FAVORITE COUNTRY MUSIC FEMALE VOCALIST VIDEO
"I Pass"
1985 American Music Awards

THE HORIZONS AWARD
1985 Music City News

References

External links
 I'm Dancing As Fast As I Can
 

1945 births
1996 deaths
Musicians from Tulsa, Oklahoma
American country singer-songwriters
American women country singers
Country musicians from Oklahoma
RCA Records artists
20th-century American singers
Road incident deaths in Oklahoma
Singer-songwriters from Oklahoma
20th-century American women singers